Liberda is a surname. Notable people with the surname include:

Bruno Liberda (born 1953), Austrian classical composer
Jan Liberda (1936–2020), Polish footballer and manager
Krystyna Liberda (born 1968), Polish biathlete
Mariusz Liberda (born 1976), Polish footballer